Ryszard Parulski (9 March 1938 – 10 January 2017) was a Polish fencer. He won a silver medal in the team foil event at the 1964 Summer Olympics and a bronze in the same event at the 1968 Summer Olympics.

A lawyer by civil profession, Parulski served as the vice-chairman of the Polish Olympic Committee from 1990 until 1992.

References

1938 births
2017 deaths
Polish male fencers
Olympic fencers of Poland
Fencers at the 1960 Summer Olympics
Fencers at the 1964 Summer Olympics
Fencers at the 1968 Summer Olympics
Olympic silver medalists for Poland
Olympic bronze medalists for Poland
Olympic medalists in fencing
Fencers from Warsaw
Medalists at the 1964 Summer Olympics
Medalists at the 1968 Summer Olympics
20th-century Polish people
21st-century Polish people